Dragutin Dimitrijević (17 August 1876 – 24 June 1917), better known by his nickname Apis, was a Serbian army officer and chief of the military intelligence section of the general staff in 1913. He is best known as the most prominent member of the Black Hand, a secret military society that organised the 1903 overthrow of the Serbian government and assassination of King Alexander I of Serbia and Queen Draga. 
Some scholars believe that he also initiated the plot to kill the Archduke Franz Ferdinand in June 1914, which led to the July Crisis and the outbreak of World War I.

In 1916, the government in exile of Serbian Prime Minister Nikola Pašić, who considered Dimitrijević a threat, filed charges of high treason against the leadership of Unification or Death. Dimitrijević was tried at Salonika before a court martial arraigned by his opponents within the Serbian government. He was found guilty of conspiring to assassinate Prince Regent Alexander Karadjordjević and executed by firing squad, along with two other members, on 26 June 1917.

Early life
Dragutin Dimitrijević was born in Belgrade, Principality of Serbia, on 19 August 1876 to an Aromanian family. His father and two brothers were often away working as tinsmiths and he grew up with his two older sisters in Niš. At the age of nine, his father died. After Dimitrijević's oldest sister married, the family moved back to Belgrade where, at the age of 16, Dimitrijević attended the Lyceum of the Principality of Serbia followed the Belgrade Military Academy as a cadet in 1892. Because of his strong physique and energy, his fellow cadets called him "Apis", a reference to the Egyptian bull-god by that name. Dimitrijević finished the academy's lower school as sixth in his class in 1896. Two years later, he enrolled in the higher school. A brilliant student, upon graduation, he was assigned to the General staff of the Serbian Army, an indication that his superiors held him in high regard.

May Coup

In 1901, Dimitrijević participated in the organisation of the first failed attempt to murder the unpopular and pro-Austrian King Alexander. On 11 June 1903 the plotters succeeded when Dimitrijević and a group of junior officers stormed the royal palace and killed King Alexander, his wife, Queen Draga and three others. During the attack, Dimitrijević was shot three times, and the bullets were never removed from his body.

Following the popular regicide, the Serbian Parliament described Dimitrijević as "the saviour of the fatherland". After various commands and staff positions he taught tactics at the Belgrade Military Academy. Around 1906 Dimitrijević visited Russia and Germany, where he learned the language and studied the latest military programs. In 1911 he helped founding  (Unification or Death), commonly known as the Black Hand, a conspiratorial network supporting the formation of a Greater Serbian state. Dimitrijević, who used the code name Apis, became the leader of the Black Hand.

Dimitrijević's main objective was the liberation and unification of all Serb populated regions under Ottoman or Austro-Hungarian rule, this became more urgent after the monarchy annexed Bosnia and Herzegovina in 1908 provoking the Bosnian Crisis. Austrian officials regarded the aspirations of Pan-Serbs as a significant threat to the Hapsburg Empire. During the Balkan Wars in 1912 and 1913, Dimitrijević took no part in the fighting. Dimitrijević had his men disguise as Albanians and commit political murders. In 1913 Dimitrijević was appointed chief of general staff intelligence in the Serbian army.

Assassination of Archduke Franz Ferdinand

In 1911, Dimitrijević had organised an attempt to assassinate the Austrian Emperor Franz Josef. In early 1914 after finding out that three young Bosnian Serb students, led by nineteen year old Gavrilo Princip, were plotting to assassinate the heir to the Austro-Hungarian Empire, during his upcoming visit to Sarajevo, the Black Hand provided the conspirators with weapons and training in Belgrade. The support came from railways employee Milan Ciganović, a member of the Black Hand, with the presumed approval of Dimitrijević.

According to historian Christopher Clark, it is possible that Ciganović had been informing Serbian Prime Minister Nikola Pašić about the plot, but this speculation rests on indirect evidence. It is however believed that, after being warned of the presence of Bosnian terrorists, Pašić gave instructions for the arrest of young Bosnians who attempted to cross back into Bosnia. However, his orders were not implemented, and the three men arrived in what was then known as the Condominium of Bosnia and Herzegovina, where they joined forces with fellow conspirators recruited by Princip's former roommate Danilo Ilić, Veljko and Vaso Čubrilović, Muhamed Mehmedbašić, Cvjetko Popović and Miško Jovanović. On 28 June 1914 Princip mortally wounded Franz Ferdinand and his wife Sophie, Duchess of Hohenberg.

On 23 July 1914, the Austro-Hungarian government sent its July Ultimatum to the Serbian government with a list of ten demands. In his response on 25 July 1914, Pašić accepted all the points of the ultimatum except the sixth, which demanded that Serbia allow an Austrian delegation to participate in a criminal investigation against those participants in the conspiracy that were in Serbia. Three days later, Austria-Hungary declared war on Serbia. In 1916, Dimitrijević was promoted to colonel shortly before his arrest on charge of high treason.

Execution
Pašić decided to get rid of the most prominent members of the Black Hand, which had officially disbanded. Dimitrijević and several of his military colleagues were arrested in December 1916 and tried on charges blaming them with attempted assassination of Regent Alexander I of Yugoslavia in September 1916. On 23 May 1917, following the Salonika Trial, Dimitrijević was found guilty of treason and sentenced to death. A month later, on 24 June 1917, he was executed by firing squad.

In 1953, Dimitrijević and his codefendants were all posthumously retried by the Supreme Court of Serbia and found not guilty because there was no proof of their alleged participation in the assassination plot.

References
Notes

Bibliography

External links

 

1876 births
1917 deaths
Military personnel from Belgrade
People from the Principality of Serbia
Serbian soldiers
Serbian people of Aromanian descent
Aromanian military personnel
Black Hand (Serbia)
Yugoslavism
1903 crimes in Europe
Assassination of Archduke Franz Ferdinand of Austria
Executed Serbian people
20th-century executions for treason
People executed for treason against Serbia
People executed by Serbia by firing squad